Plamen Nikolov may refer to:
Plamen Nikolov (footballer, born 1957)
Plamen Nikolov (footballer, born 1961)
Plamen Nikolov (footballer, born 1985)
Plamen Nikolov (politician)